Erwan Maury (born 16 June 1996) is a French professional footballer who plays as a midfielder. He previously represented both Rodez and Dijon in Ligue 2

References

External links
 

Living people
1996 births
Association football midfielders
French footballers
Dijon FCO players
US Quevilly-Rouen Métropole players
Rodez AF players
US Concarneau players
Ligue 2 players
Championnat National players